The 2018 Indonesia Open (officially known as the BLIBLI Indonesia Open 2018 for sponsorship reasons) was a badminton tournament which took place at Istora Gelora Bung Karno in Jakarta, Indonesia, from 3 to 8 July 2018 and had a total purse of $1,250,000.

Tournament
The 2018 Indonesia Open was the twelfth tournament of the 2018 BWF World Tour and also part of the Indonesia Open championships which had been held since 1982. This tournament was organized by the Badminton Association of Indonesia with the sanction from the BWF.

Venue
This international tournament was held at the Istora Gelora Bung Karno in Jakarta, Indonesia.

Point distribution
Below is the point distribution for each phase of the tournament based on the BWF points system for the BWF World Tour Super 1000 event.

Prize money
The total prize money for this tournament was US$1,250,000. Distribution of prize money was in accordance with BWF regulations.

Men's singles

Seeds

 Viktor Axelsen (final)
 Son Wan-ho (first round)
 Shi Yuqi (semi-finals)
 Srikanth Kidambi (first round)
 Chen Long (first round)
 Chou Tien-chen (second round)
 Lee Chong Wei (semi-finals)
 Prannoy Kumar (quarter-finals)

Finals

Top half

Section 1

Section 2

Bottom half

Section 3

Section 4

Women's singles

Seeds

 Tai Tzu-ying (champion)
 Akane Yamaguchi (quarter-finals) 
 P. V. Sindhu (quarter-finals)
 Ratchanok Intanon (quarter-finals)
 Chen Yufei (final)
 Carolina Marín (first round)
 Sung Ji-hyun (semi-finals)
 He Bingjiao (semi-finals)

Finals

Top half

Section 1

Section 2

Bottom half

Section 3

Section 4

Men's doubles

Seeds

 Marcus Fernaldi Gideon / Kevin Sanjaya Sukamuljo (champions)
 Mathias Boe / Carsten Mogensen (first round)
 Liu Cheng / Zhang Nan (quarter-finals)
 Li Junhui / Liu Yuchen (second round)
 Mads Conrad-Petersen / Mads Pieler Kolding (quarter-finals)
 Takeshi Kamura / Keigo Sonoda (first round)
 Takuto Inoue / Yuki Kaneko (final)
 Kim Astrup / Anders Skaarup Rasmussen (second round)

Finals

Top half

Section 1

Section 2

Bottom half

Section 3

Section 4

Women's doubles

Seeds

 Chen Qingchen / Jia Yifan (semi-finals)
 Yuki Fukushima / Sayaka Hirota (champions)
 Kamilla Rytter Juhl / Christinna Pedersen (first round)
 Shiho Tanaka / Koharu Yonemoto (second round)
 Misaki Matsutomo / Ayaka Takahashi (semi-finals)
 Lee So-hee / Shin Seung-chan (quarter-finals)
 Greysia Polii / Apriyani Rahayu (quarter-finals)
 Jongkolphan Kititharakul / Rawinda Prajongjai (second round)

Finals

Top half

Section 1

Section 2

Bottom half

Section 3

Section 4

Mixed doubles

Seeds

 Tontowi Ahmad / Liliyana Natsir (champions)
 Wang Yilü / Huang Dongping (quarter-finals)
 Tang Chun Man / Tse Ying Suet (first round)
 Zheng Siwei / Huang Yaqiong (semi-finals)
 Zhang Nan / Li Yinhui (quarter-finals)
 Mathias Christiansen / Christinna Pedersen (second round)
 Goh Soon Huat / Shevon Jemie Lai (first round)
 Chris Adcock / Gabrielle Adcock (second round)

Finals

Top half

Section 1

Section 2

Bottom half

Section 3

Section 4

References

External links
 Tournament Link

Indonesia Open (badminton)
Indonesia Open
Indonesia Open
Indonesia Open (badminton)